Patrick Henry High School is a public high school located in the Grandin Court neighborhood of Roanoke, Virginia.  It is one of the two general enrollment high schools for the Roanoke City Public Schools. The school is located on Grandin Road SW near the intersection with Brandon Avenue SW in the Raleigh Court neighborhood.

The school is named for Virginia's first governor and American Founding Father and Revolution leader Patrick Henry.

History
Patrick Henry High School’s history dates back to 1961 as construction was completed to serve approximately 1,200 students. Patrick Henry was an open campus-style school consisting of three main buildings (Parsons Building, Persinger Building, McQuilkin Building) named after prominent members of RCPS and the Roanoke community. Penn Hall, named in honor of Dr. Harry Penn, was completed in 1975, increasing the school’s capacity to 1,600. In 1989, the school division implemented the middle school concept that extended Patrick Henry’s enrollment to 9th graders.  In 2006, the school's campus style layout with multiple buildings (or, "halls") was replaced with a newly constructed, conventional school building. The entire project was completed in 2008, A new Senior patio, a small square behind the main building that is intended for use as an outside dining area during lunch periods was completed in 2010.

Academics
Patrick Henry High School is a comprehensive high school which includes grades 9-12 with a student enrollment of 1,900 students. The school offers numerous Advanced Placement courses along with partnering with Virginia Western Community College to provide Dual Enrollment college courses at PH. In 2012 - 2017 Patrick Henry was rated as one of the best high schools in America by Newsweek and currently is ranked 704 out of 2399 schools in the nation.  The Roanoke Valley Governor's School for Science and Technology also sits on Patrick Henry campus.

Athletics and extracurriculars

Patrick Henry High School is a member of the Virginia High School League and competes in the Class 5A North Region in the River Ridge District.  Patrick Henry High School has won 13 state VHSL championships in Football (1973), Basketball (1988, 1992), Tennis (2004), Forensics (2014, 2015, 2016, 2018), Girls Swim (2016, 2017, 2018, 2019), and Boys Lacrosse (2017).

PH Football Team
Patrick Henry High School Football Team won the 1973 AAA State Championship, capping an undefeated season. Merrill Gainer was the head coach of the Patrick Henry Patriots and the current football stadium at PH is named after him.

PH Boys Basketball Team
Patrick Henry High School won Group AAA state titles in boys basketball in 1988 and 1992.  University of North Carolina and eventual NBA basketball player George Lynch led the Patriots to a AAA State Championship in 1988, his junior year. Patrick Henry won in the semifinals against Alonzo Mourning's Indian River High School team. Curtis Staples led the team again in 1992. Staples went on to play at the University of Virginia and played pro basketball for eight years. The team was coached by Woody Deans. The basketball court in the new gymnasium on campus has been named Woody Deans Court in his honor.

PH Boys Tennis
In 2004, PH won the VHSL AAA State Tennis Championship. Brock Newton and Tyler Early also won the 2004 AAA State doubles championship. Both Newton and Early were inducted into the Patrick Henry High School Sports Hall of Fame with the 2022 class.

PH Forensics
In 2014 the Forensics Team won the VHSL 6A State Championship. The PH Forensics Team repeated as the 2015 5A State Champions and did a "3-Peat" 5A State Championship in 2016.  The PH Forensics team won the 2018 5A State Championship.

PH Girls Swim Team
The PH Girls Swim Team won the 2016 5A State Championship, 2017 5A State Championship, 2018 5A State Championship. and the 2019 5A State Championship.

PH Boys Lacrosse
The PH Boys Lacrosse won the 2017 5A State Championship in June 2017.

PH Chess Team and Theater
On December 10-December 12, 2006, the chess team went to the National Grade Level Championships in Lake Buena Vista, Florida and won second place for the 10th grade level. In 2007 the 10th grade chess team repeated their national second place in Houston, Texas, and the 11th grade team won the national championship. In 1988 the theatre department won state VHSL championship for the second time. The first was the year before.

Notable alumni
George Lynch – retired NBA player
Curtis Staples – former NCAA record-holder for career three-point field goals
John S. Edwards - Virginia State Senator 
Tony Atlas - bodybuilder and professional wrestler 
Tanquil Lisa Collins - actress, writer, Miss Virginia 1983
Wayne LaPierre - CEO of National Rifle Association 
Shannon Taylor - retired NFL player
Chris Combs - retired NFL player
Russell Turner - head men's basketball coach at the University of California, Irvine

References

External links
 Official Site
 Virginia Department of Education Report Card
 Great Schools site

Public high schools in Virginia
Schools in Roanoke, Virginia
Educational institutions established in 1961
1961 establishments in Virginia